Tutayev is a town in Yaroslavl Oblast, Russia. Population:   It has previously been called Romanov-Borisoglebsk, and before that it was two towns separated by the Volga River: Romanov and Borisoglebsk.

History
Before 1918, it was called Romanov-Borisoglebsk, and before 1822, when an order of the Tsar united them, there were two separate towns: Romanov (on the left bank of the Volga) and Borisoglebsk (on the right bank). Romanov has existed since the 14th century and Borisoglebsk—since the 15th century.

Overview
The majority of the population lives on the right bank of the river (the former Borisoglebsk).  The areas of town nearest to the Volga's right bank have many old wooden houses and historical buildings (including the Church of the Resurrection), but further away from the river, Soviet-era apartment buildings predominate. There is no bridge across the Volga in Tutayev, so people have to use a ferry or, alternatively, travel north to Rybinsk or south to Yaroslavl to cross.

Administrative and municipal status
Within the framework of administrative divisions, Tutayev serves as the administrative center of Tutayevsky District, even though it is not a part of it. As an administrative division, it is incorporated separately as the town of oblast significance of Tutayev—an administrative unit with the status equal to that of the districts. As a municipal division, the town of oblast significance of Tutayev is incorporated within Tutayevsky Municipal District as Tutayev Urban Settlement.

Economy
Tutayev is home to the Motor Plant, which is one of the largest producers of diesel engines for automobiles and tractors in the Commonwealth of Independent States.

Religion
The following churches are located on the left bank of the river: the Krestovozdvizhensky Cathedral (1658), the Kazan-Preobrazhensky Church (1758), the Savior-Archangel Church (1746–1751), the Pokrovskaya Church (1674), the Church of the Trinity on the Country Churchyard (1783), the Church of St. Tikhon (1911), the Blagoveschensk Church (1660), and the Leontyevskaya-Voznesenskaya Church (1795).

See also
Romanov (sheep), a breed of sheep that takes its name from the town of Romanov

References

Notes

Sources

Cities and towns in Yaroslavl Oblast
Romanovo-Borisoglebsky Uyezd
Populated places on the Volga
Golden Ring of Russia